Dahiru Awaisu Kuta (16 April 1949 – 11 June 2014) was elected Senator for the Niger East constituency of Niger State, Nigeria, taking office on 29 May 2007. He was a member of the People's Democratic Party (PDP).

Kuta gained a BA in History, Graduate Certificate in Education and Post graduate Diploma in Public Administration.
In 1983, he was elected to the Niger State House of Assembly, where he became minority whip.
In 1993, he was elected to the Federal House of Representatives and was appointed Chairman of the House Committee on Rules and Business.
He was appointed National Deputy Director of Administration at the PDP Headquarters, and secretary to the Government of Niger State.

Kuta won the 2007 PDP primary election for Niger East, defeating his brother Ibrahim Kuta, the incumbent Senator. He went on to win the Senatorial election in April 2007. 
In a mid-term evaluation of Senators in May 2009, ThisDay noted that he was member of the committee for managing the ecological menace due to operation of dams, that he had sponsored and co-sponsored fourteen motions and contributed to debates in plenary.

References

1949 births
2014 deaths
People from Niger State
Peoples Democratic Party members of the Senate (Nigeria)
21st-century Nigerian politicians